Fullerton Securities and Wealth Advisors Limited is a company headquartered in Gurgaon, India. It offers financial planning and wealth management products to mass affluent and affluent customer segments.

Background
Fullerton was incorporated in February 2008 under Indian Company Law. It is a subsidiary of Fullerton Financial Holdings, an Asian financial institution with investments in banks and finance companies in emerging markets. Fullerton Financial Holdings primarily focuses on both business banking and consumer banking. In business banking, Fullerton Financial Holdings focuses on the commercial, small and medium enterprises and self employment mass market segments. It focuses on the mass affluent and mass salaried segments in consumer banking. Fullerton Financial Holdings is a wholly owned subsidiary of Temasek Holdings, headquartered in Singapore. Fullerton Financial Holdings also has presence in India through Fullerton India Credit Company Limited.
fullertonindia

Products and Services
The products and services offered by Fullerton Securities and Wealth Advisors Limited include equity broking, equity trading, trading products financial planning, insurance, investment products and equity research.

Partnerships
Fullerton Securities and Wealth Advisors have partnered with several asset management international and Indian mutual fundscompanies. The partner profiles are as follows:

 Benchmark Mutual Fund
 Birla Sun Life Mutual Fund
 DSP Blackrock Mutual Fund
 Franklin Templeton
 HDFC Mutual Fund
 ICICI Prudential Mutual Fund
 J.P. Morgan Mutual Fund
 UTI Mutual Fund
 HSBC Mutual Fund
 SBI Mutual Fund
 Religare Mutual Fund
 Reliance Mutual Fund
 Fidelity Mutual Fund
 IDFC Mutual Fund
 Sundaram BNP Paribas Mutual Fund
 Kotak Mutual Fund
 Tata Mutual Fund
 ING Mutual Fund

Fullerton Securities and Wealth Advisors has partnered with ICICI Lombard General Insurance  to provide non-life insurance for home, vehicle, travel and health.

Company Operations
The company currently has offices across India, and it has plans to expand its operations further. The company plans to focus on catering to the needs of middle income group across India.

References

External links
 http://www.fullertonsecurities.co.in/index.aspx

 Financial services companies of India
 Companies based in Gurgaon
 Indian subsidiaries of foreign companies
Indian companies established in 2008
2008 establishments in Haryana